John William Bardo (October 28, 1948 – March 12, 2019) was an American educator, most recently serving as the 13th President of Wichita State University (WSU). Previously, Bardo served as a faculty member at Western Carolina University (WCU) after serving as the 10th Chancellor for 16 years.

Biography

Education
John grew up in Cincinnati, Ohio and graduated from Oak Hills High School. After high school, he attended the University of Cincinnati, where he graduated in 1970 with a Bachelor of Arts in economics. After attending Cincinnati, Bardo graduated from Ohio University with a Master of Arts in sociology in 1971, followed by his doctorate at the Ohio State University in 1973.

Early career
In 1976, Bardo started his career at Wichita State University in the sociology department for five years, where he also won a Fulbright scholarship to study in Australia.  In 1983, Bardo left Wichita State to become the Dean of Liberal Arts and Sciences at Southwest Texas State University (now Texas State). After serving at Southwest Texas State for three years, Bardo served as Provost and Vice President for Academic Affairs at two different institutions – the University of North Florida from 1986 to 1990 and Bridgewater State College from 1990 to 1993.

Western Carolina University
On July 1, 1995, Bardo began his 16-year tenure as the 10th Chancellor of Western Carolina University. During his tenure, enrollment grew almost twice the number from 1996, the campus grew with new buildings, and an honors college was established. Bardo resigned in 2011 to return to teaching.  WCU named a building in his honor, the "John W Bardo Fine and Performing Arts Center".

Wichita State University
In April 2012, the Kansas Board of Regents selected Bardo as the 13th President of Wichita State University. Wichita State would name a building in his honor in 2017. John started his career at WSU from 1976 to 1983.

Death
John died on March 12, 2019, in Wichita after a chronic lung condition.  His final resting place is Lakeview Cemetery in Wichita.

References

External links
 Biography – Wichita State University - (Archive)
 

1948 births
2019 deaths
Presidents of Wichita State University
Chancellors of Western Carolina University
Western Carolina University faculty
Bridgewater State University faculty
University of North Florida faculty
Texas State University faculty
Wichita State University faculty
Ohio State University Graduate School alumni
Ohio University alumni
University of Cincinnati alumni
Educators from Cincinnati
Deaths from lung disease